The Global Hunger Index (GHI) is a tool that attempts to measure and track hunger globally as well as by region and by country, prepared by European NGOs of Concern Worldwide and Welthungerhilfe. The GHI is calculated annually, and its results appear in a report issued in October each year.

The 2022 Global Hunger Index shows a dramatic hunger situation worldwide. Global progress in ending Hunger is at a near standstill. The main drivers of hunger are conflicts, the climate crisis, and the economic consequences of the COVID-19 pandemic. These drivers come on top of underlying factors such as poverty, inequality, inadequate governance. The situation is expected to continue to worsen in the face of overlapping global crises. Without fundamental changes, the goal of Zero Hunger by 2030 will not be achieved.

Global Hunger Index Report 
Created in 2006, the GHI was initially published by the US-based International Food Policy Research Institute (IFPRI) and Germany-based Welthungerhilfe. In 2007, the Irish NGO Concern Worldwide also became a co-publisher. In 2018, IFPRI withdrew from the project and the GHI became a joint project of Welthungerhilfe and Concern Worldwide.

The Global Hunger Index presents a multidimensional measure of national, regional, and global hunger by assigning a numerical score based on several aspects of hunger. Countries are then ranked by GHI score and compared to previous scores from three reference years (e.g., the 2022 GHI scores can be directly compared to 2000, 2007 and 2014 GHI scores) to provide an assessment of progress over time. In addition to presenting GHI scores, the GHI includes an essay that covers an annually changing focus topic related to hunger. The 2022 report focuses on community action that engages local leaders and citizens in improving food systems governance and accountability and provides policy recommendations on how to respond to current emergencies while also transforming food systems, so they are more equitable, inclusive, sustainable, and resilient.

Calculation of GHI scores 
Based on the values of the four indicators, a GHI score is calculated on a 100-point scale reflecting the severity of hunger, where 0 is the best possible score (no hunger) and 100 is the worst. Each country’s GHI score is classified by severity, from low to extremely alarming.

The GHI combines 4 component indicators:

Undernourishment: share of the population with insufficient caloric intake.
Child stunting: share of children under age five who have low height for their age, reflecting chronic undernutrition.
Child wasting: share of children under age five who have low weight for their height, reflecting acute undernutrition.
Child mortality: share of children who die before their fifth birthday, reflecting in part the fatal mix of inadequate nutrition and unhealthy environments.

In 2022, data were assessed for the 136 countries that met the criteria for inclusion in the GHI, and GHI scores were calculated for 121 of those countries based on data from 2017 to 2021. The data used to calculate GHI scores come from published United Nations sources (Food and Agriculture Organization of the United Nations, World Health Organization, UNICEF, and Inter-agency Group for Child Mortality Estimation), the World Bank, and Demographic and Health Surveys. 

For 15 countries, individual scores could not be calculated, and ranks could not be determined owing to lack of data. 8 countries were provisionally designated by severity based on other published data. For the remaining 7 countries, data were insufficient to allow for either calculating GHI scores or assigning provisional categories.

In previous years, topics included:
 2010: Early childhood undernutrition among children younger than the age of two.
 2011: Rising and more volatile food prices of the recent years and the effects these changes have on hunger and malnutrition.
 2012: Achieving food security and sustainable use of natural resources, when the natural sources of food become increasingly scarce.
 2013: Strengthening community resilience against undernutrition and malnutrition.
 2014: Hidden hunger, a form of undernutrition characterized by micronutrient deficiencies.
 2015: Armed conflict and its relation to hunger.
 2016: Reaching the UN Sustainable Development Goal of zero hunger by 2030.
 2017: The challenges of inequality and hunger.
2018: Forced migration and hunger.
2019: Climate change and hunger.
2020: One decade to Zero Hunger: Linking health and sustainable food systems".
2021: Hunger and Food Systems in Conflict Settings.
2022: Food Systems Transformation and Local Governance.

In addition to the yearly GHI, the Hunger Index for the States of India (ISHI) was published in 2008 and the Sub-National Hunger Index for Ethiopia was published in 2009.

An interactive map allows users to visualize the data for different years and zoom into specific regions or countries.

Global and Regional Trends in Hunger 
According to the 2022 GHI projections, the world – and 46 countries in particular – will not achieve a low level of hunger by 2030. The situation is likely to worsen in the face of the current barrage of overlapping global crises—conflict, climate change, and the economic fallout of the COVID-19 pandemic—all of which are powerful drivers of hunger. The war in Ukraine has further increased global food, fuel, and fertilizer prices and has the potential to significantly worsen hunger in 2023. The global hunger situation that has improved since 2000 according to the GHI, has largely stagnated in the recent years. The 2022 GHI score for the world is considered moderate, but at 18.2, it shows only a slight decline from the 2014 score of 19.1. While the global GHI score dropped by 5.2 points from 24.3 to 19.1 between 2007 and 2014, it has only decreased 0.9 points since then. After decades of decline, one indicator used in the GHI, the prevalence of undernourishment, shows that the share of people who lack regular access to sufficient calories is increasing. This development could be a sign that other hunger indicators are also reversing. 

Hunger is serious in both South Asia (where hunger is highest) and Africa South of the Sahara (where hunger is second highest). South Asia has the world’s highest child stunting and child wasting rates. In Africa South of the Sahara, the prevalence of undernourishment and the rate of child mortality are higher than in any other world region. Parts of East Africa are experiencing one of the most severe droughts of the past 40 years, threatening the survival of millions. In West Asia and North Africa, where hunger is moderate, there are worrying signs of a reversal in progress against hunger. Hunger is considered low in Latin America and the Caribbean, East and Southeast Asia, and Europe and Central Asia.

Country rankings 
Country rankings as per the Global Hunger Index.

Legend

Note: As always, rankings and index scores from this table cannot be accurately compared to rankings and index scores from previous reports.
 
1 Ranked according to 2022 GHI scores. Countries that have identical scores are given the same ranking (for example, Costa Rica and United Arab Emirates are both ranked 18th).
 
2 The 17 countries with 2022 GHI scores of less than 5 are not assigned individual ranks, but rather are collectively ranked 1-17. Differences between their scores are minimal.
 
*For 15 countries, individual scores could not be calculated, and ranks could not be determined owing to lack of data. Where possible, these countries were provisionally designated by severity: 4 as ''serious'' and 4 as ''alarming''. For 7 countries, provisional designations could not be established.

2022 GHI: Food Systems Transformation and Local Governance 
Facing the third global food price crisis in 15 years, it is more obvious than ever that our current food systems are inadequate to end poverty and hunger. The GHI emphasizes that the international community urgently needs to respond to the escalating humanitarian crises - while not losing sight of the need for long-term transformation of food systems.

The GHI 2022 focuses on the way communities, local governments, and civil actors engage with each other to make decisions and allocate resources is key to improving the food situation for people, and especially for the most vulnerable ones. It emphasizes the power of communities on a local level to shape how their food systems are governed. 

In her essay, Danielle Resnick explains that a recent trend toward decentralizing government functions has given local governments greater autonomy and authority, including over key elements of food systems. And in fragile states local or informal sources of governance, such as traditional authorities, may have greater credibility with communities. Yet in several countries, civic spaces are subject to increasing repression, hindering citizens from claiming and realizing their right to adequate food. Moreover, citizens are often unaware of this right, even if it has been enshrined in national law. Thus, the GHI emphasizes that decision-makers must put inclusive local governance, accountability, and the realization of the right to food at the center of food system transformation. 

At the same time, the essay by Danielle Resnick shows how local action can help citizens realize their right to food. It provides promising examples from a variety of settings where citizens are finding ways to amplify their voices in food system debates to improve food systems governance at the local level and hold decision makers accountable for addressing food and nutrition insecurity and hunger. Encouragingly, it points out that examples of empowerment are as visible in fragile contexts with high levels of societal fractionalization as they are in more stable settings with longer traditions of local democracy. These include a range of tools such as systems for tracking government budgets and expenditures, community scorecards for assessing the performance of local governments, and inclusive multistakeholder platforms that engage a range of local actors, including government officials, community groups, and private sector participants, in policy planning. 

In summary, the GHI emphasizes that motivated and inclusive governance at all levels that ensure citizens’ participation, action, and oversight is pivotal for meaningful food system transformation that ultimately benefits all people, especially the most vulnerable. All levels of government must include local voices and capacities and promote strong local decision-making structures, with the efforts tailored to the conditions and capacities on the ground.

2021 GHI: Hunger and Food Systems in Conflict Settings 
In their essay, guest authors Dan Smith and Caroline Delgado describe how, despite the devastating COVID-19 pandemic, violent conflicts continued to be the main cause of global hunger in 2020. The number of active violent conflicts is increasing, and they are becoming more severe and protracted. They state that the reciprocal linkages between hunger and conflict are widely known. Violent conflict affects nearly all aspects of a food system, from production, harvesting, processing, and transport to commodity supply, financing, marketing, and consumption. Meanwhile, increased food insecurity can fuel violent conflict. Smith and Delgado argue that without a solution to food insecurity, it is difficult to build sustainable peace, and without peace, chances of ending world hunger are minimal.

If progress is to be made in both stemming conflict and fighting hunger, a food security lens must be integrated into peace building and a peace-building lens should be integrated into the effort to create resilient food systems. For this the guest authors propose four priorities: (1) adopt a flexible and agile approach; (2) work through partnerships; (3) pursue integrative ways of working; and (4) break down funding silos.

The 2021 GHI states that even in the midst of conflict and extreme vulnerability, it remains possible to disrupt the destructive links between conflict and hunger and build resilience. By working collaboratively, involved actors—from states and community groups to nongovernmental organizations (NGOs) and United Nations agencies—can build a foundation for food security and sustainable peace. Integrating a peace-building perspective into building resilient food systems and a food security perspective into peace building requires a thorough knowledge of the context and sensitivity to the realities of ongoing conflicts. Thus, the GHI emphasizes the importance of strengthening locally led interventions and taking into account local concerns and aspirations, while building partnerships that bring together different actors and their respective knowledge. Moreover, funding should be provided in a flexible and long-term manner and should be adaptable to contexts that are fluid, fragile, and conflict affected. Finally, the 2021 GHI calls for a more vigorous approach to addressing conflicts at the political level and prosecuting those who use hunger as a weapon of war.

2020 GHI: Linking Health and Sustainable Food Systems 
The events of 2020 are laying bare many of the vulnerabilities of the world’s food system in ways that are becoming impossible to ignore. However, by taking an integrated approach to health and food and nutrition security, it may yet be possible to achieve Zero Hunger by 2030. A One Health approach, which is based on a recognition of the interconnections between humans, animals, plants, and their shared environment, as well as the role of fair-trade relations, would address the various crises we face holistically and help avert future health crises, restore a healthy planet, and end hunger.

A One Health lens brings into focus a number of weaknesses including the fragility of globalized food systems; underinvestment in local farmers, farmer associations, and smallholder-oriented value chains; increasing rates of diet-related noncommunicable disease; emergency responses that disrupt local food systems; the heavy environmental cost of food systems; inadequate social protection for much of the world’s population; unfair global food governance, including unjust trade and aid policies; and lack of secure land tenure, which results in food insecurity for rural communities, indigenous people, women, and marginalized groups.

To ensure the right to adequate and nutritious food for all and achieve Zero Hunger by 2030, we must approach health and food and nutrition security in a way that considers human, animal, and environmental health and fair-trade relations holistically. Multilateral institutions, governments, communities, and individuals must take a number of actions in the short and long term, including sustaining the production and supply of food; ensuring social protection measures; strengthening regional food supply chains; reviewing food, health, and economic systems through a One Health lens to chart a path to environmental recovery; and working toward a circular food economy that recycles nutrients and materials, regenerates natural systems, and eliminates waste and pollution.

2019 GHI: The Challenge of Hunger and Climate Change 
The 2019 GHI report notes that climate change is making it ever more difficult to adequately and sustainably feed and nourish the human population. Climate change has direct and indirect negative impacts on food security and hunger through changes in food production and availability, access, quality, utilization, and stability of food systems. In addition, climate change can contribute to conflict, especially in vulnerable and food-insecure regions, creating a double vulnerability for communities, which are pushed beyond their ability to cope.

Furthermore, climate change raises four key inequities that play out at the interface of climate change and food security:

1.	the degree of responsibility for causing climate change

2.	the intergenerational impacts of climate change

3.	the impacts of climate change on poorer people in the Global South

4.	the ability and capacity to deal with climate change impacts

Current actions are inadequate for the scale of the threat that climate change poses to food security. Transformation—a fundamental change in the attributes of human and natural systems—is now recognized as central to climate-resilient development pathways that can achieve zero hunger. Individual and collective values and behaviors must push toward sustainability and a fairer balance of political, cultural, and institutional power in society.

2018 GHI: Forced Migration and Hunger 
The 2018 Global Hunger Index (GHI) report—the 13th in the annual series—presents a multidimensional measure of national, regional, and global hunger by assigning a numerical score based on several aspects of hunger. It then ranks countries by GHI score and compares current scores with past results. The 2018 report shows that in many countries and in terms of the global average, hunger and undernutrition have declined since 2000; in some parts of the world, however, hunger and undernutrition persist or have even worsened. Since 2010, 16 countries have seen no change or an increase in their GHI levels.

The essay in the 2018 GHI report examines forced migration and hunger—two closely intertwined challenges that affect some of the poorest and most conflict-ridden regions of the world. Globally, there are an estimated 68.5 million displaced people, including 40.0 million internally displaced people, 25.4 million refugees, and 3.1 million asylum seekers. For these people, hunger may be both a cause and a consequence of forced migration.

Support for food-insecure displaced people needs to be improved in four key areas:

•	recognizing and addressing hunger and displacement as political problems;

•	adopting more holistic approaches to protracted displacement settings involving development support;

•	providing support to food-insecure displaced people in their regions of origin; and

•	recognizing that the resilience of displaced people is never entirely absent and should be the basis for providing support.

The 2018 Global Hunger Index report presents recommendations for providing a more effective and holistic response to forced migration and hunger. These include focusing on those countries and groups of people who need the most support, providing long-term solutions for displaced people, and engaging in greater responsibility sharing at an international level.

2017 GHI: The Inequalities of Hunger 
The 2017 highlights the uneven nature of progress made in reducing hunger worldwide and the ways in which inequalities of power lead to unequal nourishment.

Achieving the UN Sustainable Development Goals’ aim of “leaving no one behind” demands approaches to hunger and malnutrition that are both more sensitive to their uneven distribution and more attuned to the power inequalities that intensify the effects of poverty and marginalization on malnutrition. The report emphasizes the importance of using power analysis to name all forms of power that keep people hungry and malnourished; the significance of designing interventions strategically focused on where power is exerted; the need to empower the hungry and malnourished to challenge and resist loss of control over the food they eat.

2016 GHI: Getting to Zero Hunger 
The 2016 Global Hunger Index (GHI) presents a multidimensional measure of national, regional, and global hunger, focusing on how the world can get to Zero Hunger by 2030.

The developing world has made substantial progress in reducing hunger since 2000. The 2016 GHI shows that the level of hunger in developing countries as a group has fallen by 29 percent. Yet this progress has been uneven, and great disparities in hunger continue to exist at the regional, national, and subnational levels.

The 2016 GHI emphasizes that the regions, countries, and populations most vulnerable to hunger and undernutrition have to be identified, so improvement can be targeted there, if the world community wants to seriously Sustainable Development Goal 2 on ending hunger and achieving food security.

2015 GHI: Armed Conflict and Chronic Hunger
The chapter on hunger and conflict shows that the time of great famines with more than 1 million people dead is over. There is, however, a clear connection between armed conflict and severe hunger. Most of the countries scoring worst in the 2015 GHI are experiencing or have recently experienced armed conflict. Still, severe hunger also exists without conflict present, as the cases of several countries in South Asia and Africa show.

Armed conflict has increased since 2005, and unless it can be reduced, there is little hope for eliminating hunger.

2014 GHI: Hidden Hunger 
Hidden hunger concerns over 200 million people worldwide. This micronutrient deficiency develops when humans do not take in enough micronutrients such as zinc, folate, iron and vitamins, or when their bodies cannot absorb them. Reasons include an unbalanced diet, a higher need for micronutrients (e.g. during pregnancy or while breast feeding) but also health issues related to sickness, infections or parasites.

The consequences for individuals can be devastating: these often include mental impairment, bad health, low productivity and death caused by sickness. In particular, children are affected if they do not absorb enough micronutrients in the first 1000 days of their lives (beginning with conception).

Micronutrient deficiencies are responsible for an estimated 1.1 million of the yearly 3.1 million death caused by undernutrition in children. Despite the magnitude of the problem, it is still not easy to get precise data on the spread of hidden hunger. Macronutrient and micronutrient deficiencies cause a loss in global productivity of 1.4 to 2.1 billion US Dollars per year.

Different measures exist to prevent hidden hunger. It is essential to ensure that humans maintain a diverse diet. The quality of produce is as important as the caloric input. This can be achieved by promoting the production of a wide variety of nutrient-rich plants and the creation of house gardens.

Other possible solutions are the industrial enrichment of food or biofortification of feedplants (e.g. vitamin A rich sweet potatoes).

In the case of acute nutrient deficiency and in specific life phases, food supplements can be used. In particular, the addition of vitamin A leads to a better child survival rate.

Generally, the situation concerning hidden hunger can only be improved when many measures intermesh. In addition to the direct measures described above, this includes the education and empowerment of women, the creation of better sanitation and adequate hygiene, and access to clean drinking water and health services.

2013 GHI: Resilience to Build Food and Nutrition Security 
Many of the countries in which the hunger situation is "alarming" or "extremely alarming" are particularly prone to crises: In the African Sahel people experience yearly droughts. On top of that, they have to deal with violent conflict and natural calamities. At the same time, the global context becomes more and more volatile (financial and economic crises, food price crises).

The inability to cope with these crises leads to the destruction of many development successes that had been achieved over the years. In addition, people have even less resources to withstand the next shock or crises. 2.6 billion people in the world live on less than US$2 per day. For them, a sickness in the family, crop failure after a drought, or the interruption of remittances from relatives who live abroad can set in motion a downward spiral from which they cannot free themselves on their own.

It is therefore not enough to support people in emergencies and, once the crisis is over, to start longer-term development efforts. Instead, emergency and development assistance has to be conceptualized with the goal of increasing resilience of poor people against these shocks.

The Global Hunger Index differentiates three coping strategies. The lower the intensity of the crises, the less resources have to be used to cope with the consequences:

 Absorption: Skills or resources are used to reduce the impact of a crisis without changing a household's lifestyle (e.g., selling some livestock).
 Adaptation: Once the capacity to absorb is exhausted, steps are taken to adapt the household's lifestyle to the situation without making drastic changes (e.g., using drought-resistant seeds).
 Transformation: If adaptation strategies do not suffice to deal with the negative impact of the crisis, fundamental, longer-lasting changes to life and behavior have to be made (e.g., nomadic tribes become sedentary farmers because they cannot keep their herds).

Based on this analysis, the authors present several policy recommendations: 
 Overcoming the institutional, financial, and conceptual boundaries between humanitarian aid and development assistance.
 Elimination of policies that undermine people's resilience. Using the Right to Food as a basis for the development of new policies.
 Implementation of multi-year, flexible programs, which are financed in a way that enables multisectoral approaches to overcome chronic food crises.
 Communicating that improving resilience is cost-effective and improves food and nutrition security, especially in fragile contexts.
 Scientific monitoring and evaluation of measures and programs with the goal to increase resilience.
 Active involvement of the local population in the planning and implementation of resilience-increasing programs.
 Improvement of food, especially of mothers and children, through nutrition-specific and nutrition-sensitive interventions to prevent short-term crises from leading to nutrition-related problems late in life or across generations.

2012 GHI: Pressures on Land, Water, and Energy Resources 
Increasingly, hunger is related to how we use land, water, and energy. The growing scarcity of these resources puts more and more pressure on food security.
Several factors contribute to an increasing shortage of natural resources:
 Demographic change: The world population is expected to be over 9 billion by 2050. Additionally, more and more people live in cities. Urban populations feed themselves differently than inhabitants of rural areas; they tend to consume less staple foods and more meat and dairy products.
 Higher income and non-sustainable use of resources: As the global economy grows, wealthy people consume more food and goods, which have to be produced with a lot of water and energy. They can afford not to be efficient and wasteful in their use of resources.
 Bad policies and weak institutions: When policies, for example energy policy, are not tested for the consequences they have on the availability of land and water it can lead to failures. An example are the biofuel policies of industrialized countries: As corn and sugar are increasingly used for the production of fuels, there is less land and water for the production of food. 
Signs for an increasing scarcity of energy, land and water resources are for example: growing prices for food and energy, a massive increase of large-scale investment in arable land (so-called land grabbing), increasing degradation of arable land because of too intensive land use (for example, increasing desertification), increasing number of people, who live in regions with lowering ground water levels, and the loss of arable land as a consequence of climate change.

The analysis of the global conditions lead the authors of the GHI 2012 to recommend several policy actions:
 Securing land and water rights
 Gradual lowering of subsidies
 Creation of a positive macroeconomic framework
 Investment in agriculture technology development to promote a more efficient use of land, water and energy
 Support for approaches, that lead to a more efficient use of land, water and energy along the whole value chain
 Preventing and overuse of natural resources through monitoring strategies for water, land and energy, and agricultural systems
 Improvement of the access to education for women and the strengthening of their reproductive rights to address demographic change
 Increase incomes, reduce social and economic inequality and promotion of sustainable lifestyles
 Climate change mitigation and adaptation through a reorientation of agriculture

2011 GHI: Rising and Volatile Food Prices 
The report cites 3 factors as the main reasons for high volatility, or price changes, and price spikes of food:
 Use of the so-called biofuels, promoted by high oil prices, subsidies in the United States (over one third of the corn harvest of 2009 and 2010 respectively) and quota for biofuel in gasoline in the European Union, India and others.
 Extreme weather events as a result of Climate Change
 Future trading of agricultural commodities, for instance investments in fonds, which are speculating on price changes of agricultural products (2003: 13 Bn US Dollar, 2008: 260 Bn US Dollar), as well as increasing trade volume of these goods.

Volatility and prices increases are worsened according to the report by the concentration of staple foods in a few countries and export restrictions of these goods, the historical low of worldwide cereal reserves and the lack of timely information on food products, reserves and price developments. Especially this lack of information can lead to overreactions in the markets. Moreover, seasonal limitations on production possibilities, limited land for agricultural production, limited access to fertilizers and water, as well as the increasing demand resulting from population growth, puts pressure on food prices.

According to the Global Hunger Index 2011 price trends show especially harsh consequences for poor and under-nourished people, because they are not capable to react to price spikes and price changes. Reactions, following these developments, can include: reduced calorie intake, no longer sending children to school, riskier income generation such as prostitution, criminality, or searching landfills, and sending away household members, who cannot be fed anymore. In addition, the report sees an all-time high in the instability and unpredictability of food prices, which after decades of slight decrease, increasingly show price spikes (strong and short-term increase).

At a national level, especially food importing countries (those with a negative food trade balance), are affected by the changing prices.

2010 GHI: Early Childhood Undernutrition 

Undernutrition among children has reached terrible levels. About 195 million children under the age of five in the developing world—about one in three children—are too small and thus underdeveloped. Nearly one in four children under age five—129 million—is underweight, and one in 10 is severely underweight. The problem of child undernutrition is concentrated in a few countries and regions, with more than 90 percent of stunted children living in Africa and Asia. 42% of the world's undernourished children live in India alone.

The evidence presented in the report shows that the window of opportunity for improving nutrition spans is the 1,000 days between conception and a child's second birthday (that is the period from -9 to +24 months). Children who are do not receive adequate nutrition during this period have increased risks to experiencing lifelong damage, including poor physical and cognitive development, poor health, and even early death. The consequences of malnutrition that occurred after 24 months of a child's life are by contrast largely reversible.

See also
 List of countries by percentage of population living in poverty

Literature
 2022 – Food Systems Transformation and Local Governance
 2021 – Hunger and Food Systems in Conflict Settings
 2020 – One Decade to Zero Hunger - Linking Health and Sustainable Food Systems
 2019 – The Challenge of Hunger and Climate Change
 2018 – Forced Migration and Hunger
 2017 – The Inequalities of Hunger
 2016 – Getting to Zero Hunger
 2015 – Armed Conflict and the Challenge of Hunger
 2014 – The Challenge of Hidden Hunger
 2013 – The Challenge of Hunger: Building Resilience to achieve Food and Nutrition Security
 2012 – The Challenge of Hunger: Ensuring Sustainable Food Security Under Land, Water, and Energy Stresses
 2011 – The Challenge of Hunger: Taming Price Spikes and Excessive Food Price Volatility 
 2010 – The Challenge of Hunger: Focus on the Crisis of Child Undernutrition
 2009 – The Challenge of Hunger: Focus on Financial Crisis and Gender Inequality
 2008 – The Challenge of Hunger 2008
 2007 – The Challenge of Hunger 2007
 2006 – The Challenge of Hunger 2006

Further reading 
 Alkire, S. und M. E. Santos. 2010. "Multidimensional Poverty Index: 2010 data". Oxford Poverty and Human Development Initiative.
 Wiesmann, Doris (2004): An international nutrition index: concept and analyses of food insecurity and undernutrition at country levels. Development Economics and Policy Series 39. Peter Lang Verlag.

Development studies

Food politics
International rankings
Social statistics data
Malnutrition
Hunger
Measurements and definitions of poverty

References